Sir Timothy Shelley, 2nd Baronet (7 September 1753 – 24 April 1844) was an English politician and lawyer. He was the son of Sir Bysshe Shelley, 1st Baronet of Castle Goring and the father of Romantic poet and dramatist Percy Bysshe Shelley.

Early life and education
Timothy Shelley was the son of Sir Bysshe Shelley and his wife Mary Catherine Michell (1734-1760), daughter of the Reverend Theobald Michell and his wife Mary Tredcroft. He studied at University College, Oxford, and was awarded his bachelor's degree in 1778; his master's degree following in 1781. He then studied law at Lincoln's Inn.

Career
Shelley was elected as a member of parliament (MP) for Horsham, Sussex at the 1790 general election, but an election petition was lodged and the result was overturned on 19 March 1792. He was elected as MP for New Shoreham at the 1802 general election. Shelly was re-elected for Shoreham in 1806, 1807, and 1812, and held the seat until he stood down at the 1818 general election.

He associated with the Duke of Norfolk during his time in the British political sphere.

Personal life

Shelley married Elizabeth Pilfold in October 1791 and they moved to Field Place in Warnham, approximately  outside London. The couple had seven children:
 Percy Bysshe (1792–1822), English Romantic poet
 Elizabeth (1794–1831) 
 Hellen (1796–1796)
 Mary (1797–1884)
 Hellen (1799–1885)
 Margaret (1801–1887)
 John (1806–1866)

None of Shelley's daughters married except for Mary who in 1819, married D. F. Haynes.

Ancestry

Titles

 Mr Timothy Shelley (1753–1790)
 Mr Timothy Shelley MP (1790–1815)
 Sir Timothy Shelley (1815–1844)

Shelley inherited the baronetcy in 1815, becoming the 2nd Baronet Shelley, of Castle Goring, Sussex.

References

External links 
 

1753 births
Alumni of University College, Oxford
Members of Lincoln's Inn
Members of the Parliament of Great Britain for English constituencies
Baronets in the Baronetage of the United Kingdom
British MPs 1790–1796
Members of the Parliament of the United Kingdom for English constituencies
UK MPs 1802–1806
UK MPs 1806–1807
UK MPs 1807–1812
UK MPs 1812–1818
1844 deaths
Shelley baronets, of Castle Goring
People from Warnham